30 Años (Spanish "treinte años") or 30 Anos (Portuguese "trinta anos") may refer to:

30 Años Despues, album by the Mexican group Los Freddy's 1992
30 Años, album by Loquillo 2009
30 Años, album by Irakere
30 Años, album by Pedro Guerra
30 Años, album by Mercedes Sosa 1993
30 Años, album by Tropicália
30 Años, album by Nepal (band)
30 Años, Raíces (band) with Andrés Calamaro 2008 
30 Años, album by Basque musician Ñaco Goñi
30 Años, Orquesta del Tango de la Ciudad de Buenos Aires, nominated Latin Grammy Award for Best Tango Album 2011
30 Años de Exitos by Los Toreros Muertos 1988 
30 Años de Canciones Blindadas, Piero De Benedictis
30 Años de ser el Príncipe José José
30 años en Vivo Eva Ayllón 2000 
30 Años de Sabor 1992 El Gran Combo de Puerto Rico

See also
A Mis Niños de 30 Años, by Miliki, List of number-one albums of 2000 (Spain)